Beet yellow net virus (BYNV) is a plant pathogenic virus of the family Luteoviridae.

External links
ICTVdB - The Universal Virus Database: Beet yellow net virus
Family Groups - The Baltimore Method

Viral plant pathogens and diseases